Kutai is a historical region in what is now known as East Kalimantan, Indonesia on the island of Borneo and is also the name of the native ethnic group of the region (known as Urang Kutai or "the Kutai people"), numbering around 300,000 who have their own language known as the Kutainese language which accompanies their own rich history. Today, the name is preserved in the names of three regencies in East Kalimantan province which are the Kutai Kartanegara Regency, the West Kutai Regency and the East Kutai Regency with the major river flowing in the heart of the region known as the Mahakam River. Kutai is known to be the place of the first and oldest Hindu kingdom to exist in East Indies Archipelago, the Kutai Martadipura Kingdom which was later succeeded by the Muslim Kutai Kartanegara Sultanate.

Kingdoms of Kutai 
Historically, there have been two kingdoms which ruled in the region of Kutai which are:
Kutai Martadipura Kingdom (399–1635), a Hindu kingdom
Kutai Kartanegara Sultanate (1300–1844), a Muslim kingdom

Kingdom of Kutai Martadipura 

The Kutai Martadipura Kingdom (locally known as Kerajaan Kutai Martadipura) is a 4th-century or perhaps much earlier Hindu kingdom located in the Kutai area, East Kalimantan. Its capital is believed to be the current Muara Kaman district located in Kutai Kartanegara Regency and is one of, if not the earliest ancient kingdom(s) in Indonesian history. Muara Kaman district which is currently one of the many districts in Kutai Kartanegara regency is proven to be the place where the capital of the kingdom once stood, it is proven by an ancient remnant of a megalith stone known as Lesong Batu, believed to have been used to make the Yupa inscriptions during the 4th century AD. The seven stone pillars, or yūpa (“sacrificial posts”), have been found in Kutai, Kaman Estuary, near the Mahakam River. The plinths bear an inscription in the Pallava script of India reading "A gift to the Brahmin priests" in Sanskrit. The style of the script has been dated to the last half the 4th century. It is believed these religions were brought to Indonesia around the 2nd and 4th centuries, respectively, when Indian traders arrived on the islands of Sumatra, Java and Sulawesi.

The names of three rulers are known from the inscriptions. The first ruler mentioned is Kuḍungga, the “lord of men” (narendra), his son Aśwawarman, styled the “founder of the dynasty” (vaṇśa-kartṛ) and grandson of the first and son of the later, Mulavarman called the “lord of kings” (rājendra). As the name "Kuṇḍungga" does not seem to be a name of Sanskrit-Hinduistic origin while the other two are, it is presumed he was a leader of local origin (Dayak people) and it was his son Aśwawarman that adopted the Hinduistic belief. The origin of Kudungga has long been debated, some sources also argue that he was of Indian origin, presumably a descendant from the royalties of the Magadha empire, as Dayak people back then lived in the inner jungle parts of Borneo not in the coastal areas, while others argued that the name is similar to Bugis name of Kadungga, with several inscriptions similar to what is found in Kutai were found in Sulawesi. During the reign of King Mūlawarman, he is the one who let the Yūpa inscriptions be made, and it was believed to be made by the Brahmins which received alms from Mulavarman. While nothing of the military actions of his two predecessors is known, "Raja" Mūlawarman is stated to have conquered his neighbors in battle. He is also said to have increased the land of Kutai by a Vedic ritual known as the "Asvaredjwa", a ritual also performed by Indian rulers of the past. This ritual required a horse released to his land. The footsteps of the freely roaming horse were taken as evidence that this land belonged to his kingdom. Mulawarman was also known for his tribute of gold to his God. The name of his kingdom is not mentioned on the inscriptions nor do any other documents in other countries relate to a kingdom at this time in this region. It is not known what became of the kingdom after these pillars had been erected. It may be possible that the name Kutai, as in Tuñjung Kute of the 1365 Javanese Majapahit poem Nāgarakṛtāgama is as ancient and reflects the original name used a thousand years earlier.

Lesong Batu Megalith stone

The Lesong Batu is a megalith stone located in Muara Kaman district, Kutai Kartanegara Regency believed to be the remnants to make the ancient Yupa inscriptions during the 4th century AD.

Sultanate of Kutai Kartanegara 

The Kutai Kartanegara Sultanate (locally known as Kesultanan Kutai Kertanegara ing Martadipura) was established around the end of the 13th century AD in the region of Tepian Batu or Kutai Lama. The first known ruler is known to be Aji Batara Agung Dewa Sakti, who was thought to have ruled from 1300 to 1325. Aji Pangeran Sinum Panji Mendapa, who ruled 1635–1650, was able to conquer the kingdom of Kutai Martadipura and merged the two realms thus becoming "Kutai Kartanegara Ing Martadipura".

In 1667, the Dutch V.O.C. attacked Makassar on the island of Sulawesi leading to the downfall of the Bugis Kingdom of Gowa. Some of the Bugis under the leadership of Lamohang Daeng Mangkona or Pua Ado I immigrated to Kutai on neighboring Borneo (Kalimantan) and the ruler of Kutai allowed them to settle in Kampung Melantai around the Karang Mumus River, now known as Kampung Selili. This settlement eventually developed into the modern town of Samarinda.

Islam took hold in the region since the 17th century (most of the Bugis were Muslims) and Aji Muhammad Idris, ruling 1732–1739?, was the first ruler to have an Islamic name.

After a civil war Aji Imbut, after finally becoming the ruler as Aji Muhammad Muslihuddin in 1780, moved the capital in 1782 from Pemarangan to Tepian Pandan. The name of the capital city eventually developed from Tangga Arung to its present form of Tenggarong.

In 1844, following the repulse of James Erskine Murray's expedition and attempt to settle, the Dutch defeated the Sultan Aji Muhammad Salehudin, forcing him into exile, and took direct control of Kutai.

The Japanese invaded the region in 1942 and acknowledged a "Kooti Kingdom", that was a subject of the Tenno. In 1945 Kutai joined, along with its neighbours, into the East Kalimantan federation.

In 1949 Kutai finally became part of the United States of Indonesia.

Kutai governance now
Currently, the region of Kutai is part of the Kutai Kartanegara Regency headed by a regent (known locally as Bupati) which is under the auspices of the regional government of East Kalimantan Province. Meanwhile, the Sultan of Kutai currently still exists and resides in the Kutai Palace (Kedaton), but administratively, the governance is conducted by the regional government of the Republic of Indonesia, not the sultanate. The Sultan holds an honorary status in Kutai and is highly respected by Kutai people. During the festival of Erau, he will be the guest of honour accompanied by the local government officials such as the governor of East Kalimantan and the Regent of Kutai Kartanegara.

The Kutai People

The Kutai people, or known locally as Urang Kutai is the ethnic group which their ancestors are believed to be descendants of the Dayak Ot Danum people that have already embraced Islam and currently live on the banks of the great Mahakam River, East Kalimantan. They are native to the city of Tenggarong, Kutai Kartanegara Regency, the West Kutai Regency and the East Kutai Regency.

The Kutai Language 

The traditional language of the region is referred to as Tanggarong Kutainese language (Bahasa Kutai Tenggarong), such as Banjarese to the south, Kota Bangun Kutainese to the west, Beraunese to the north, and other languages spoken in coastal east Borneo. This language belongs to the large Austronesian family of languages.

Gallery

See also 
 Kutai Kartanegara Regency
 Kutai National Park

References 

Kutai Martadipura
 Vogel, J.Ph. 1918 The yūpa inscriptions of King Mūlavarman from Koetei (East Borneo). Bijdragen tot de Taal-, Land- en Volkenkunde 74:216–218.
Chhabra, B.Ch. 1965 Expansion of Indo-Aryan culture during Pallava rule (as evidenced by inscriptions). Delhi: Munshi Ram Manohar Lal. 50–52, 85–92;
Casparis, J.G. de 1975 Indonesian palaeography: a history of writing in Indonesia from the beginning to c. A.D. 1500. Leiden: E.J. Brill. 14–18

External links 
Explanation of the Kutai Kingdoms
Example of Kutai language
Kutai traditional music
 The Museum of Mulawarman
 Description of the Erau, a traditional yearly Kutai culture festival.

Historical regions
Former countries in Borneo
Precolonial states of Indonesia
Hindu Buddhist states in Indonesia
Kutai
Ethnic groups in Indonesia
Historical Hindu kingdoms